Casalmaggiore is a comune in the province of Cremona, Lombardy, Italy, located across the Po River. It was the birthplace of Italian composers Ignazio Donati and Andrea Zani.
It became worldwide famous thanks to its Women Volleyball Team Volleyball Casalmaggiore especially in the years between 2015-2018.

Sights include the Duomo (Cathedral), the Museo Diotti, and the Bijoux Museum.

History
Archaeological findings in 1970 proved that the area was inhabited from the Bronze Age, although the town most likely was founded by the Romans as Castra Majora ("Main Military Camp"). Around the year 1000 it was a fortified castle in the House of Este lands; in the 15th century it was under the Republic of Venice. On July 2, 1754, it obtained the status of city with an imperial decree. After a period under the Austrians, it became part of the newly unified Kingdom of Italy in 1861.

Twin towns
 Guilherand-Granges, France
 Tarnów, Poland

References

Municipalities of the Province of Cremona